Ioannis Papaioannou or Giannis or Yannis Papaioannou can refer to:

 Giannis Papaioannou (1913–1972), Greek rembetiko composer
 Ioannis Papaioannou (chess player)